Megabirnaviridae is a family of double-stranded RNA viruses with one genus Megabirnavirus which infects fungi. The group name derives from member's bipartite dsRNA genome and mega that is greater genome size (16 kbp) than families Birnaviridae (6 kbp) and Picobirnaviridae (4 kbp). There is only one species in this family: Rosellinia necatrix megabirnavirus 1. Diseases associated with this family include: reduced host virulence.

Structure
Viruses in the family Megabirnaviridae are non-enveloped, with icosahedral geometries, and T=1 symmetry. The diameter is around 50 nm.

Genome 

The genome is composed of two double-stranded RNA segments of 7.2–8.9 kbp each and of a total length of 16.1 kbp. The genome codes for four proteins.

Life cycle
Viral replication is cytoplasmic. Entry into the host cell is achieved by penetration into the host cell. Replication follows the double-stranded RNA virus replication model. Double-stranded RNA virus transcription is the method of transcription. The virus exits the host cell by cell to cell movement. Fungi serve as the natural host. Transmission routes are parental and sexual.

Taxonomy 

The family Megabirnaviridae has one genus which has one species:
 Megabirnavirus
 Rosellinia necatrix megabirnavirus 1

References

External links
 ICTV Report: Megabirnaviridae
 Viralzone: Megabirnaviridae

 
Virus families
Riboviria